Marie Salander (born 25 October 1985) is a Swedish footballer defender who plays for Kvarnsvedens IK.

External links 
 

1985 births
Living people
Swedish women's footballers
Damallsvenskan players
Women's association football defenders
Kvarnsvedens IK players
Elitettan players